Jaganath Sinivas (born 27 October 1998) is an Indian cricketer. He made his first-class debut on 12 February 2020, for Tamil Nadu in the 2019–20 Ranji Trophy.

References

External links
 

1998 births
Living people
Indian cricketers
Tamil Nadu cricketers
Place of birth missing (living people)